Batesville Tool & Die, Inc. is a precision metal stamping company that supplies parts to the automotive, appliance, and global industrial markets. It is a privately held company headquartered in Batesville, IN. In addition to the Batesville facility, parts are also manufactured at the Troqueladora Batesville de México plant in Querétaro, Mexico. This satellite plant began production in 2000.

The company was founded in 1978 by Ron Fledderman along with his business partners. His son, Jody Fledderman, is currently the President and CEO. Jody is also serving as the President of the Precision Metalforming Association.

References 
Progressive Tooling

External links 
 btdinc.com
 btdinc.com.mx
 Bloomberg BusinessWeek Listing
  Indiana Economic Development Development Corporation article
 Precision Metalforming Association Website

Companies based in Indiana